Telmanove is an urban settlement (town) in Donetsk Oblast, located in the industrial region of the Donets Basin. It was renamed Boikivske by the Verkhovna Rada in 2016, after the DNR had taken de facto control. Until 1935 it was known as Ostheim (Osthaim) and then renamed after the German Communist Ernst Thälmann. According to the Ukrainian authorities, it was the administrative seat of Telmanove Raion until its abolition in 2020, and is now part of Kalmiuske Raion. According to the Russian authorities, which control the settlement, Telmanove Raion was never abolished and continues to exist. Population: 

After elimination of all Germans from the territory during World War II, the village was resettled by Boykos deported from territories that were transferred by Soviet Union to Poland in 1951 (see 1951 Polish–Soviet territorial exchange).

Since 2014, Telmanove has been administered as a part of the de facto Donetsk People's Republic. Pro-Russian separatists seized the town backed by Russian military forces in August 2014 as part of the war in Donbas.

References

External links
 Telmanove at the Ukrainian Soviet Encyclopedia

German communities

Urban-type settlements in Kalmiuske Raion